Salaise-sur-Sanne is a commune in the Isère department in southeastern France.

Population

Notable people
 Jeanne Bouvier

See also
Communes of the Isère department

References

Communes of Isère
Isère communes articles needing translation from French Wikipedia